Robert Fabre (21 December 1915 in Villefranche-de-Rouergue, Aveyron – 23 December 2006 in Villefranche-de-Rouergue, Aveyron) was a French politician and pharmacist.

He was a founding member of the Left Radical Movement (MRG) in 1972 and served as the leader of the MRG until 1978. In this capacity, he became known as the "third man" - the third signatory of the Common Programme of the Union of the Left with François Mitterrand (PS) and Georges Marchais (PCF). He was himself excluded from the party in 1979 when he accepted a special research mission on work offered to him by right-wing President Valéry Giscard d'Estaing. He founded the Federation of Radical Democracy, but the party never achieved significant success.

He died in 2006, shortly after the death of Jean-Jacques Servan-Schreiber, his rival within the Radical-Socialist Party. Servan-Schreiber has been the leader of the right wing of the Radical Party.

1915 births
2006 deaths
People from Villefranche-de-Rouergue
Politicians from Occitania (administrative region)
Radical Party (France) politicians
Radical Party of the Left politicians
Deputies of the 2nd National Assembly of the French Fifth Republic
Deputies of the 3rd National Assembly of the French Fifth Republic
Deputies of the 4th National Assembly of the French Fifth Republic
Deputies of the 5th National Assembly of the French Fifth Republic
Deputies of the 6th National Assembly of the French Fifth Republic
French pharmacists
Ombudsmen in France
Chevaliers of the Légion d'honneur